Liddell Power Station is a coal-fired thermal power station with four  GEC steam driven turbine alternators for a combined electrical capacity of . 

Commissioned between 1971 and 1973, the station is located adjacent to Lake Liddell near Muswellbrook in the Hunter Region of Australia. It is expected to be fully closed down by April 2023.

History
In September 1964, the Government of New South Wales announced its intention to build the Liddell Power Station adjacent to Lake Liddell. The first of four generators was completed in 1971, two more in 1972, and the fourth in 1973. At the time of its completion, Liddell was the most powerful generating station in Australia. Liddell was the first major power station in New South Wales to be built inland, using fresh water for cooling instead of the more abundant salt water used in coastal power stations. To accommodate this, Lake Liddell was expanded to provide more water requiring an 11 kilometre section of the Main Northern railway line to be rebuilt on a new alignment. The completion of Liddell aided in the retirement of power stations in Sydney, such as Balmain and Bunnerong.

Originally the plant was fitted with the then-standard electrostatic precipitators for dust collection, and the more efficient fabric filters (as used at Eraring, Munmorah units 3 and 4, Vales Point 5+6, Bayswater and Mount Piper) were retrofitted in the early 1990s, reducing particulate emissions to a barely visible level. Much of the coal is supplied by overland conveyors from mines it shares with the nearby Bayswater Power Station.

In 2007, a project commenced at Liddell to replace some of the station's boiler feed-water by hot water from a solar thermal array. As of March 2007, the project was at a second-stage prototype but had not been connected to the power station. Subsequently the 9 MW solar section was added to the Liddell coal-fired generator, but has now effectively been closed. Analysts say the incentive to use the solar boost was reduced by the removal of the carbon price and excess coal supply.

Liddell power station was owned by the Electricity Commission of New South Wales, with ownership transferred in 1996 to Macquarie Generation. In September 2014 Liddell was included in the sale of Macquarie Generation by the New South Wales government to AGL Energy.

Alternative fuel sources
In addition to the coal-fired steam turbines, Liddell runs two 25 MW oil-fired gas turbines and an 0.85 MW mini-hydroelectric generator. It is also "licensed to co-fire plant biomass and coal to produce electricity", which essentially means it can use sawdust and wood shavings from the nearby timber industry as a portion of its fuel, replacing up to 5% of its coal requirements. In practice, however, biomass accounts for only about 0.5% of Liddell's output.

Greenhouse emissions
Carbon Monitoring for Action estimates Liddell power station emits 14.70 million tonnes of greenhouse gases each year as a result of burning coal. In 2010 the Australian Government introduced a Carbon Pollution Reduction Scheme to help combat climate change. The scheme has impacted on emissions from power stations.

Expected closure
AGL announced in 2015 and reaffirmed in 2017 that it intends to close the Liddell Power Station in 2022. The closure of this and other coal-burning power stations in Australia led the Prime Minister Malcolm Turnbull to seek advice from the Australian Energy Market Operator on extending the life of a number of them, to head off anticipated future electricity shortages. Turnbull said the government had been advised that if the Liddell plant were to close in 2022, there would be a 1000MW gap in base load, dispatchable power generation.  The Turnbull Government asked AGL to keep Liddell open beyond 2022, or to sell the Liddell Power Plant to Alinta Energy. In August 2019, AGL announced that three of the turbines would be able to be kept running until April 2023, to ensure reliable power supply to New South Wales during the 2022–23 summer.

In December 2018, a proposed upgrade to the Bayswater Power Station was approved to be completed around the same time as the proposed closure of Liddell. Both are owned by AGL Energy and consume coal from the same mine. The upgrade approval did not impose tighter air emission controls, however AGL claimed that the closure of Liddell would result in a net improvement in air quality.

After Liddell's closure, the site is planned to house a big battery of at least 150 MW.

The first turbine was closed in April 2022, with the other three turbines planned to close on 28 April 2023.

Operations 
The generation table uses eljmkt nemlog to obtain generation values for each year. Records date back to 2011.

See also

 Energy in Australia

References

External links

Proposed 38 MW solar thermal "coal saver" plant at Liddell
Solar thermal plant at the Liddell Power Station gets government support

Coal-fired power stations in New South Wales
Muswellbrook Shire
Energy infrastructure completed in 1971
1971 establishments in Australia